Dhipur Islamia Fazil Madrasah is a Bangladeshi school located in Tongibari, Munshiganj. It is affiliated with the Islamic University, Kushtia and Islamic Arabic University.

History
The Madrasa was first established in Marialoy, later moving to its current location. It is currently located in the village of Dhipur, near Tongi Bari upazila ( south). The Madrasa was established on 1 January 1980.

Infrastructure
There are 5 two-storied buildings with 26 rooms, a computer lab, a science lab, 2 tube wells and 3 toilets in the madrasah. The school premises is approximately 0.90 hectares (2.22 acres).

Computer Lab
The Sheikh Russell Digital Lab was provided by the Government of Bangladesh in order to educate students on Information Technology. Here, classes are conducted using a variety of media in order to improve student engagement with academic content. There are also arrangements for admission to various computer learning courses within the school and in outside institutions.

Education System
Under the Madrasah Education Board, the students of the General department receive a modern education alongside religious education. Textbooks provided by the board are distributed among the students on 1 January. Students also observe national days by discussing Islamic days and other co-education programs (painting, composition contests, ghazals, presenting national songs, etc).

Staff
There are 20 skilled, trained teachers among the school's staff.

Result

Management Committee
The governing body of the Madrasa consists of 15 members, including Engg. Kazi Abdul Wahid (president), 3 electoral members and 9 members.

Gallery

See also
 Madrasa
 Qawmi Madrasah
 Government Madrasah-e-Alia

References

External links
 Website of Madrasah

Education in Bangladesh
Alia madrasas of Bangladesh
Munshiganj District